Macrozamia platyrhachis is a species of plant in the family Zamiaceae. It is endemic to Australia.

References

platyrhachis
Least concern flora of Australia
Nature Conservation Act endangered biota
Least concern biota of Queensland
Endangered flora of Australia
Flora of Queensland
Taxonomy articles created by Polbot